The 2015 Florida Atlantic Owls football team represented Florida Atlantic University in the 2015 NCAA Division I FBS football season as members of the East Division of Conference USA. They were led by second-year head coach Charlie Partridge and played their home games at FAU Stadium in Boca Raton, Florida. They finished the season 3–9, 3–5 in C-USA play to finish in a three way tie for fourth place in the East Division.

Schedule
Florida Atlantic announced their 2015 football schedule on February 2, 2015. The 2015 schedule consist of six home and away games in the regular season. The Owls will host CUSA foes Florida International (FIU), Marshall, Middle Tennessee, and Rice, and will travel to Charlotte, Old Dominion, UTEP, and Western Kentucky (WKU).

Schedule source:

Game summaries

at Tulsa

Miami (FL)

Buffalo

at Charlotte

Rice

Marshall

at UTEP

FIU

at Western Kentucky

Middle Tennessee

at Florida

at Old Dominion

References

Florida Atlantic
Florida Atlantic Owls football seasons
Florida Atlantic Owls football